Unia Racibórz can refer to:

RTP Unia Racibórz, women's football team
KP Unia Racibórz, men's football team